Mount Wendland is a peak (1,650 m) near the head of Massam Glacier, 2 nautical miles (3.7 km) northeast of Mount Kenney, in the Prince Olav Mountains. The feature was geologically mapped on November 18, 1970, by the United States Antarctic Research Program (USARP) Ohio State University Party of 1970–71. Named by Advisory Committee on Antarctic Names (US-ACAN) for Vaughn P. Wendland, geologist and field assistant with the Ohio State party.

Mountains of the Ross Dependency
Dufek Coast